Codakia is a genus of saltwater clams, marine bivalve molluscs in the family Lucinidae.

Species
Species within the genus Codakia include:
 Codakia californica T. A. Conrad, 1837 
 Codakia costata d'Orbigny, 1842 
 Codakia cubana W. H. Dall, 1901 
 Codakia distinguenda G. W. Tryon, 1872 
 Codakia exasperata L. A. Reeve, 1850 
 Codakia filiata W. H. Dall, 1901 
 Codakia golikovi Zorina, 1978 
 Codakia interrupta J. B. Lamarck, 1816 
 Codakia minuata Deshayes, 1863 
 Codakia orbicularis C. Linnaeus, 1758 
 Codakia paytenorum T. Iredale, 1927 
 Codakia pectinella C. B. Adams, 1852 
 Codakia perobliqua R. Tate, 1892 
 Codakia punctata C. Linnaeus, 1758 
 Codakia reevei G. P. Deshayes, 1863 
 Codakia rufigera L. A. Reeve, 1835 
 Codakia tigerina C. Linnaeus, 1758

References

Lucinidae
Bivalve genera
Taxa named by Giovanni Antonio Scopoli